Deep Sehgal is a British film-maker whose work includes the Emmy nominated series Soul Deep, India with Sanjeev Bhaskar and Selling Jesus.

After graduating with degrees in philosophy from the universities of Dundee and Grenoble, Sehgal trained as a journalist at Leeds University and started his career as a researcher in the documentary film unit at BBC Manchester. His first film as a producer was the British Film Institute/Channel Four drama "Sleep" which premiered at the Edinburgh Festival in 1999. The following year he directed his first film, a documentary about his mother entitled "The Good Son" for Channel Four.

He then moved to the BBC, eventually becoming a senior producer in the Specialist Factual unit at BBC Bristol. He was the director of The Hitch-Hiker's Guide to the Galaxy segment in the BBC series Big Read, and made a number of documentary films that received popular and critical acclaim and won a number of international awards. He was also a founder of the BBC Film Lab which was created to help new directors make their first films. Sehgal now runs the independent production company Avatar Productions with actor Sanjeev Bhaskar.

Recent work as creator, executive producer and director includes the BBC period drama series The Indian Doctor, written by Bill Armstrong. On 15 March 2011, the series was awarded the national Royal Television Society Award, and was also nominated in five categories at the BAFTA Cymru Awards, winning two BAFTAs in the editing and acting categories.

Sehgal is also a published author. His work includes the book, India, which accompanied the BBC television series of the same name. The book went on to reach number 4 in The Sunday Times  bestseller list.

References

Living people
British documentary filmmakers
Year of birth missing (living people)
British people of Indian descent